Wilbur Vernon "Sandy" Brotherton (July 6, 1922 – January 15, 2021) was an American politician and businessman from the state of Michigan.

Biography
Brotherton was born in Chicago, Illinois and went to Waller High School in Chicago. He served in the United States Army Air Corps during World War II and was a navigator. Brotherton went to Northwestern University. Brotherton  He lived in Farmington, Michigan with his wife and family and worked as an executive for the Packard & Chrysler Corporation Chr. Brotherton served on the Farmington City Council and was mayor of Farmington. Brotherton also served on the Oakland County Commission. He served in the Michigan House of Representatives from 1975 to 1988 and was a Republican.

References

1922 births
2021 deaths
Politicians from Chicago
People from Farmington, Michigan
Military personnel from Illinois
Businesspeople from Michigan
Northwestern University alumni
Mayors of places in Michigan
Michigan city council members
County commissioners in Michigan
Republican Party members of the Michigan House of Representatives
20th-century American politicians